= SmartUse =

SmartUse Solutions, Inc.
- Industry: Construction
- Founded: 2012
- Founder: Dominic Sévigny and Louis Dagenais
- Headquarters: Montreal, Quebec, Canada
- Products: Application
- Website: www.smartuse.com

SmartUse is a collaborative construction software. The solution offers a touch friendly mobile app who helps construction projects to move in a paperless environment through features like field markups, photos and issues tracking.

SmartUse is a privately held company based in Montreal, Canada. Founded in 2012 by Dominic Sévigny, the company was sold to Newforma in 2014 and re-acquired in September 2017 by the original founder and Louis Dagenais.

SmartUse is available on Windows since 2012 and on iPad since 2016.
